Wenvoe Quarry is a quarry located between Wenvoe and Culverhouse Cross in the Vale of Glamorgan, south Wales. It is situated in an area close to the A4050 road known as "The Alps", not far from Caerau and Culverhouse Cross on the outskirts of Cardiff. The quarry extracts limestone rock from the Carboniferous Black Rock Limestone Sub-Group of the Pembroke Limestone Group and in particular the Friar’s Point Limestone. The rock is crushed and screened to produce a variety of construction aggregates. 

Operations at the quarry took off in the 1880s to supply the building of Barry Docks, and as of 1889 the quarry employed some 200 men. The quarry is operated today by Breedon Group. 

The closed Wenvoe Tunnel begins in close proximity to the quarry.

1889 accident
Harding was rescued alive, but died about an hour later from a fractured skull and complications shortly before arriving in hospital.

Coed-y-Cymdda
Coed-y-Cymdda was an archaeological site that was excavated prior to its destruction by quarrying operations in 1978-1980. It was an earthwork hill-slope enclosure dating from the late bronze age. Archaeological finds indicated activity on the site until the Roman period.

References

Quarries in Wales
Economy of the Vale of Glamorgan